Atlético Deportivo Olímpico is a Peruvian football club, playing in the city of Callao, Lima, Peru.

History
The club was the 1970 Peruvian Segunda División champion.

The club have played at the highest level of Peruvian football in the 1971 Torneo Descentralizado, but was relegated the same year.

Honours

National
Peruvian Segunda División:
Winners (1): 1970
Runner-up (1): 1968

Liga Provincial del Callao:
Winners (1): 1963

See also
List of football clubs in Peru
Peruvian football league system

External links
 ADO del Callao 1971

Football clubs in Peru